Basile Decortès (6 December 1921 – 30 October 2011) was a French racing cyclist. He rode in the 1950 Tour de France.

References

1921 births
2011 deaths
French male cyclists
Place of birth missing